Uryu-ko is an earthfill dam located in Chiba Prefecture in Japan. The dam is used for irrigation. The catchment area of the dam is 0.3 km2. The dam impounds about 4  ha of land when full and can store 264 thousand cubic meters of water. The construction of the dam was completed in 1951.

References

Dams in Chiba Prefecture
1951 establishments in Japan